The 2017 Philadelphia Union season was the club's eighth season in Major League Soccer, the top flight of American soccer. The team was managed by Jim Curtin, his fourth season with the club. The Union finished the 2017 season with the same points total as the 2016 season, but did not clinch entry to the MLS Cup Playoffs. The 2017 season also marks a new goalscoring record by C. J. Sapong who scored 16 goals in a single season, eclipsing Sebastian Le Toux's record of 14 goals during the inaugural season.

Background

MLS SuperDraft

2016 MLS regular season
During the 2016 MLS season the Union finished with an 11–14–9 record, which was enough for a playoff berth, the franchise's first since 2011, as the sixth seed. The Union also had a franchise record eight wins at home, finishing 8–5–4 at home and 3–9–5 on the road.

2016 MLS Cup Playoffs
The Union faced Toronto FC in the Eastern Conference knockout round, where they lost 3–1 at BMO Field. The Union's only playoff goal of 2016 was scored by Alejandro Bedoya in the 73rd minute of that game.

2016 Lamar Hunt U.S. open
The Union entered the fourth round of the U.S. Open Cup playing host to the Harrisburg City Islanders and won by a score of 3–2, advancing to play the New York Red Bulls in the round of 16, where a two-goal effort by Chris Pontius lifted the Union to a 2–1 victory. The Union went on to lose 4–2 in penalties to the New England Revolution after playing to a 1-1 draw through extra time in the quarterfinals.

2017 roster

Current squad

DP indicates Designated Player
GA indicates Generation Adidas Player
HGP indicates Home Grown Player
INT indicates MLS International Player and qualifies for an international roster spot

Current staff

Competitions

Preseason

MLS season

U.S. Open Cup

Friendlies

Standings

Eastern Conference standings

League standings

Statistics

Appearances and goals

|-
! colspan="12" style="background:#0E1B2A; color:#B1872D;  text-align:center"| Defenders

|-
! colspan="12" style="background:#0E1B2A; color:#B1872D;  text-align:center"| Midfielders

|-
! colspan="12" style="background:#0E1B2A; color:#B1872D;  text-align:center"| Forwards

|}
Statistics are from all matches as documented by Soccerway.com.

Top scorers

Goalkeepers

Record = W-L-D

Transfers

In

Out

Loan in

Loan out

Honors and awards

MLS Player of the Week

MLS Save of the Week

End-of-season awards

References

External links
 Official Website
 Philadelphia Union at ESPN FC

Philadelphia Union seasons
Philadelphia Union
Philadelphia Union
Philadelphia Union